Cayley surface may refer to:
 Cayley's nodal cubic surface
 Cayley's ruled cubic surface